Madonna and Child is a 1720 oil on canvas painting by Francesco Solimena, a prolific Italian painter of the Baroque era, one of an established family of painters and draughtsmen. It is now in the Art Gallery of South Australia.

References 

Paintings of the Madonna and Child
Collections of the Art Gallery of South Australia